The Sibley Lake National Wildlife Refuge is located in the U.S. state of North Dakota and consists of 1,077 acres (4.35 km2). Sibley Lake is a privately owned easement refuge, managed with by the U.S. Fish and Wildlife Service. The refuge was established to protect habitat for migratory bird species, white-tail deer, and other mammals. The refuge contains a 525-acre (2.12 km2) fresh water marsh that provides excellent migratory bird habitat. Valley City Wetland Management District oversees the refuge, which in turn is a part of the Arrowwood National Wildlife Refuge Complex.

References

External links
  - includes Sibley Lake National Wildlife Refuge
 

National Wildlife Refuges in North Dakota
Easement refuges in North Dakota
Protected areas of Griggs County, North Dakota